Voices for America's Children (Voices) was a 501(c)(3) non-profit organization located in Washington, DC.  Voices is a U.S. nonpartisan, national organization that advocates for the well-being of children at the federal, state and local levels of government. It addresses areas such as early childhood education, health, juvenile justice, child welfare, tax and budget decisions.
It was renamed from National Association of Child Advocates in 2003.

Voices for America's Children closed its doors in June 2013, although its members group continue their work at the state and local level.

History
Voices for America's Children began when child advocates from the US met for the first time in 1981 and formed the National Association of State-based Child Advocacy Organization (ACA) in 1984.  In 2003, ACA changed its name to Voices for America's Children.

In 1996 the National Association of Child Advocates established its annual Florette Angel Memorial Child Advocacy Award in memory of Florette Angel and her efforts to improve the lives of West Virginia children.

In 2004, the organization prepared and published a report named “Early Learning Left Out: An Examination of Public Investments in Education and Development by Child Age". The report was based on a comprehensive analysis of public investments in education and child development. It covered three age groups - early years (0-5), school age (6-18) and college age (19-23) - across 12 states. The report was updated the following year and then again in 2010.

Voices for America's Children received two grants from Atlantic Philanthropies, a $1.8 million grant in 2006 and a $3 million three-year-grant in 2008.

In 2011, after reviewing ten Republican candidates' debates and campaign websites, Voices found that only 2.2% of the debates referenced children-related issues.

In 2012 Voices sent letters to Democratic candidate President Barack Obama and Republican presidential candidate Mitt Romney urging them to clarify their stance on child and family issues and to formally seek the advice of child advocates.

In 2013 Voices was dissolved after a vote by the Board of Trustees. In September of the same year President Obama appointed William Bentley, former CEO of Voices, to head Family and Youth Services Bureau.

Members
Voices has 62 member organizations in 46 states of the US, as well as in The US Virgin Islands and the District of Columbia (DC)..  A member is an organization that belongs to the Voices network and is a nonprofit organization that is either: a provider coalition with an advocacy component to its overall agenda; or the state or community affiliate of a national single-issue child advocacy organization; or a state or community-based organization focused primarily on public awareness, resource or referral or direct services, with child advocacy as part of its mission; or a KIDS COUNT grantee without child advocacy as any component of its agenda.

Funding
Financial backing is provided by membership fees and grants from the following foundations:
 The Annie E. Casey Foundation
 The Atlantic Philanthropies
 The David and Lucile Packard Foundation
 The John S. and James L. Knight Foundation
 The William Penn Foundation
The Pew Charitable Trusts

References

External links 
 Homepage (via archive.org)
 2010 pamphlet which includes list of member groups (via archive.org)

Children's charities based in the United States
Children's rights organizations in the United States